Michał Ciarkowski (born 5 July 1989) is a Polish professional footballer who plays as a winger for Lechia Dzierżoniów. He is right-footed.

Honours
Dyskobolia Grodzisk Wlkp.
Ekstraklasa Cup: 2007–08

External links
 

1989 births
Living people
Footballers from Poznań
Polish footballers
Poland youth international footballers
Association football midfielders
Dyskobolia Grodzisk Wielkopolski players
Polonia Warsaw players
Flota Świnoujście players
Warta Poznań players
Motor Lublin players
GKS Bełchatów players
Gryf Wejherowo players
Kotwica Kołobrzeg footballers
Unia Janikowo players
Ekstraklasa players
I liga players
II liga players
III liga players